The 1967 Richmond Spiders football team was an American football team that represented the University of Richmond as a member of the Southern Conference (SoCon) during the 1967 NCAA University Division football season. In their second season under head coach Frank Jones, Richmond compiled a 5–5 record, with a mark of 5–2 in conference play, finishing in third place in the SoCon.

Schedule

References

Richmond
Richmond Spiders football seasons
Richmond Spiders football